Waltenheim-sur-Zorn is a commune in the Bas-Rhin department in Grand Est in north-eastern France.

It lies on the road D332 next to the Marne-Rhine Canal.

Population

See also
 Communes of the Bas-Rhin department

References

Communes of Bas-Rhin